A Silver Alert is a public notification system in the United States to broadcast information about missing persons – especially senior citizens with Alzheimer's disease, dementia, or other mental disabilities  – in order to aid in locating them.

Silver Alerts use a wide array of media outlets – such as commercial radio stations, television stations, and cable television – to broadcast information about missing persons. In some states (specifically Arizona, California, Colorado, Florida, Illinois, Maryland, New Jersey, North Dakota, Texas, Washington and Wisconsin), Silver Alerts also use variable-message signs on roadways to alert motorists to be on the lookout for missing seniors. In cases in which a missing person is believed to be missing on foot, Silver Alerts have used Reverse 911 or other emergency notification systems to notify nearby residents of the neighborhood surrounding the missing person's last known location. Silver Alerts can also be used for children who are missing without being in danger or abducted.

Supporters of Silver Alert point to the United States growing elderly population as a reason to support new programs to locate missing seniors. Approximately six in ten dementia sufferers will wander off at least once. If not found within 24 hours, up to half of wandering seniors with dementia suffer serious injury or death.

Activation criteria
Activation criteria for Silver Alerts vary from state to state. Some states limit Silver Alerts to persons over the age of 65 who have been medically diagnosed with Alzheimer's disease, dementia, or a mental disability. Other states expand Silver Alert to include all children and adults with mental or developmental disabilities. In general, the decision to issue a Silver Alert is made by the law enforcement agency investigating the report of a missing person. Public information in a Silver Alert usually consists of the name and description of the missing person and a description of the missing person's vehicle and license plate number, e.g. David Smith GRN 2002 Oldsmobile Bravada FL LIC 989 ARN.

History 
In December 2005, Oklahoma state Representative Fred Perry (R-Tulsa) announced his intention to introduce an "AMBER Alert for seniors", which he dubbed "Silver Alert." In March 2006, the Oklahoma House of Representatives passed H.R. 1075, a resolution calling for a Silver Alert system to find missing seniors. In response to this non-binding resolution, the Oklahoma Department of Public Safety added Silver Alert notifications to the statewide alerts sent to law enforcement agencies and the media for rapid distribution. In April 2009, Governor Brad Henry signed legislation permanently establishing the Silver Alert program.

In Georgia, public efforts to locate missing seniors increased following the April 2004 disappearance of Mattie Moore, a 68-year-old Atlanta resident with Alzheimer's disease. Eight months after Moore's disappearance, her body was found 500 yards (460 m) from her home. The City of Atlanta created "Mattie's Call" to coordinate and support Metro Atlanta law enforcement, emergency management and broadcasters to issue an urgent bulletin in missing persons cases involving persons with Alzheimer's disease, dementia and other mental disabilities. Legislation to create a statewide Mattie's Call program was enacted in April 2006.

In Florida,  Mary Zelter, an 86-year-old resident of Largo, drove away from her assisted-living facility on February 26, 2008, and never returned. Her submerged car was nearby. This tragedy prompted Pinellas County officials to create a Silver Alert pilot program that later grew into a statewide initiative.

National growth
Thirty-seven states and the District of Columbia have Silver Alert or similar programs targeting missing seniors. 

Twenty-eight states and the District of Columbia have missing persons recovery programs that are formally called "Silver Alert":

 Alaska
 Arizona
 Arkansas
 California
 Connecticut
 District of Columbia
 Florida
 Illinois
 Indiana
 Kansas
 Louisiana
 Maine
 Maryland
 Massachusetts
 Mississippi
 Nevada
 New Jersey
 New Mexico
 North Carolina
 North Dakota
 Oklahoma
 Oregon
 Rhode Island
 South Carolina
 Tennessee
 Texas
 Washington
 West Virginia
 Wisconsin

Additionally, nine states have programs to help locate missing seniors that are not officially called "Silver Alert" but contain criteria similar to existing Silver Alert programs:

 Alabama Missing Senior Alert
 Colorado Missing Senior Citizen Alert
 Georgia Mattie's Call
 Kentucky Golden Alert
 Michigan Mozelle Senior or Vulnerable Adult Medical Alert Act
 New Hampshire Missing Senior Citizen Alert
 New York Missing Vulnerable Adult Alert 
 Ohio Missing Adult Alert
 Virginia Senior Alert

Plus, ten states have missing-persons alert systems with broader criteria than conventional Silver Alert programs. These missing-person alerts apply to larger categories of endangered persons, or apply to all missing people, regardless of age or impairment:
 

 Delaware Gold Alert
 Idaho Endangered Missing Person Alert
 Minnesota Brandon's Law
 Missouri Endangered Person Advisory
 Montana Missing and Endangered Persons Advisory
 Nebraska Endangered Missing Advisory
 Pennsylvania Missing and Endangered Person Advisory
 South Dakota Endangered Persons Advisory
 Utah Endangered Person Advisory
 Wyoming Endangered Person Advisory

Federal legislation
In May 2008, Representative Lloyd Doggett introduced the National Silver Alert Act in the U.S. House of Representatives, a bill to encourage, enhance, and integrate Silver Alert plans throughout the United States. Similar legislation was filed by Representatives Gus Bilirakis (R-FL) and Sue Myrick (R-NC). The three bills were combined into a single bill, H.R. 6064. The bill was passed by the House in September 2008 by a voice vote, but the 110th Congress adjourned before it could be considered in the U.S. Senate.

The National Silver Alert Act was re-introduced in the 111th Congress as H.R. 632. It was passed by the House of Representatives on February 11, 2009, on a voice vote. Companion legislation (S.557) was introduced in the Senate by Senator Mel Martinez (R-FL) and Senator Herb Kohl (D-WI).

Senator Joe Manchin (D-WV) reintroduced the bill as S.1814 in the 113th Congress on December 12, 2013. The National Silver Alert Act was referred to the United States Senate Committee on the Judiciary but was not voted on before the U.S. Senate adjourned.

The National Silver Alert Act has been endorsed by the Assisted Living Federation of America (ALFA), Alzheimer's Association, Alzheimer's Foundation of America, Elder Justice Coalition, National Silver Haired Congress, the National Association of Police Organizations and the National Sheriffs' Association.

Criticism
Critics of Silver Alert have raised concerns that the proliferation of color-coded alerts will reduce their importance, risking that alerts would be ignored as a "wolf cry". For example, Texas has created an Amber Alert, Silver Alert and Blue Alert (issued to locate an assailant in the event a law enforcement officer is killed or injured.) In New York, Governor George Pataki vetoed Silver Alert legislation in 2003, citing his concern that it would weaken the Amber Alert system and make the alerts too common. In the absence of state-level legislation, local Silver Alert programs have been enacted by New York City and five New York counties: Rockland, Suffolk, Nassau, Niagara and Erie.

Some critics have raised concerns about the cost of implementing the Silver Alert program on a nationwide basis. The Congressional Budget Office has estimated that implementation of the National Silver Alert Act would cost $59 million over a five-year period. During the House debate on the cost, Representative Ted Poe (R-TX) noted that states with Silver Alerts have reported nominal costs associated with operating the system, since they are able to utilize existing Amber Alert infrastructure to issue Silver Alerts.

Retrieval rate
Because the implementation of Silver Alert systems varies from state to state, there are no national statistics for the retrieval rates resulting from Silver Alerts. However, among the states that publicly release statistics, retrieval rates indicate a higher level of success. For example, In North Carolina, 128 Silver Alerts were issued in 2008. Of these, 118 seniors were safely recovered.

In Georgia, Mattie's Call garnered a safe return for 70 of the 71 calls issued between its inception in 2006 and January 2009.

In Texas, the Silver Alert system was invoked 52 times in the first year following its inception in September 2007. Of these alerts, 48 of the missing seniors were located safely, and 13 of these recoveries were directly attributable to Silver Alert.

In Florida, 136  Silver Alerts were issued in its first year (2008–2009), leading to 131 safe recoveries. 19 of these recoveries were directly attributable to Silver Alert. Over two years, 227 Silver Alerts have been issued in Florida – with 220 seniors located safely, and 36 of those recoveries attributed directly to the Silver Alert. Over three years, 377 Silver Alerts have been issued in Florida, with 367 seniors located safely, and 51 of those recoveries attributed directly to the Silver Alert.

In Wisconsin, 18 Silver Alerts were issued in the first 5 months of the program, out of which 15 of missing seniors were found and safely returned home.

See also
AMBER Alert
Mattie's Call

References

External links 

 American Silver Alert Coalition
 Report on Silver Alert Initiatives in the States, National Association of State Units on Aging
 

Alzheimer's disease
Emergency communication
Emergency services in the United States
Law enforcement in the United States
Missing people organizations
United States elder law